HBL PSL Hamaray Heroes Award was introduced by Pakistan Cricket Board during the tournament of Pakistan Super League in 2020. According to the criteria of the Hamaray Heroes campaign, online nominations of individuals (with notable achievements) are received from the fans and 34 winners are finally shortlisted by PCB Board of Governors for HBL PSL Hamaray Heroes Award with a Cash Prize of PKR 240,000.00 every year. Individuals from different walks of life (including sports, education, healthcare, art, culture, music, social work and technology) can be nominated who directly help others, whose work is improving the wellbeing of others, or whose achievements are inspiring others. Being the unsung heroes, the selected 34 winners of HBL PSL Hamaray Heroes Award are being recognized, celebrated and encouraged throughout the 34 matches of the tournament.

Notable Hamaray-Heroes 
Many prominent Pakistanis like Hisham Sarwar (freelancer), Syed Zafar Abbas Jafri and Farhan Wilayat Butt (philanthropists), Ali Sadpara (mountaineer), Ayesha Chundrigar ( Animal Rights Activist), Marvia Malik (Pakistan's first Transgender Newsreader), and Rashid Naseem ( Martial Arts Champion) have been rewarded under this initiative during the PSL matches at Lahore, Multan and Karachi.

See also
 Pakistan Cricket Board
 Pakistan Blind Cricket Council
 Pakistan Super League
 Cricket in Pakistan
 Pakistan national cricket team

References

External Links
Official Website of Pakistan Super League 
Pakistan Super League T20 Cricket 

Pakistan Super League
Twenty20 cricket leagues
Cricket leagues in Pakistan
Annual events in Pakistan
Awards established in 2020